A crowbar is a tool with a curved end used for prying objects apart.

Crowbar may also refer to:

 Digging bar, usually referred to as a crowbar in the UK, a straight metal bar used for post hole digging or for leverage

Music
 Crowbar (American band), a sludge metal band from Louisiana, who formed in 1988
 Crowbar (album), the self-titled 1993 album by the American band
 Crowbar (Canadian band), a rock band from the 1970s, from Hamilton, Ontario

People
 Crowbar (wrestler) (born 1974), a ring name of professional wrestler Christopher Ford
 The nickname of one-legged BMX rider Kurt Yaeger

Other uses
 Crowbar (circuit), a type of electrical circuit
 Crowbar (alcoholic beverage), a type of cocktail
 Crowbar (comics), a member of the DC Comics supervillain group The Cadre
 Koevoet (which is Afrikaans and Dutch for crowbar), a South West African Police counterinsurgency unit

See also